Krusadai Island is an uninhabited island in the Gulf of Mannar situated south of Pamban Island. The island belongs to India and forms a part of the Gulf of Mannar Marine National Park.

References 

 Marimuthu, N., Wilson, J.J. and Kumaraguru, A.K. 2010. Galaxea, J Coral Reef Studies, 12(2): 65-75 Reef status in the Mandapam group of Islands, Gulf of Mannar
 

Islands of Tamil Nadu
Uninhabited islands of India
Islands of India